William Alexander Bailey (performing under the stage names Alex Bailey and Bisquit) is an American musician, drummer, and bassist.

Biography 
Bailey was born on December 25, 1987, in Kansas City, Missouri. Growing up in a heavily musical based family, he is a multi-instrumentalist, producer and recording artist. In 2006, Bailey was selected to be in the Grammy Band and performed with the Gibson/Baldwin Grammy High school Jazz Ensemble.

In 2011, Alex graduated Berklee College of Music, earning a dual major bachelor's degree in Music Performance and Professional Music.

Alex performed with the band  of "Ryan Saranich/Alex Bailey Project" in spring of 2013. He later then toured with singer Judith Hill in the fall of (2013-2014). Bailey currently has been touring with Marcus Miller since October 2015.

Affiliations 
Marcus Miller, Judith Hill, Ryan Saranich, Elan Trotman, Tim Bowmen, Alex Han, Tim Bailey, Jon Barnes, Wayne Lindsey, Chiddy Bang, Dessy Di Lauro, Gerald Vesley, Brian Simpson, Andre Ward, Zenzo Matoga, Ashmont Hill, David 'Fuze' Fiuczynski, Jack DeJohnette, Phil Perry, JoAnn Condury, Oscar Peterson, Gabriela Martina, Stanley Porter.

References

External links 
 http://teamalexbailey.com/
 http://galeria.trojmiasto.pl/Alex-Bailey-517749.html?id_imp=406240&pozycja=11

Berklee College of Music alumni
Living people
American multi-instrumentalists
Musicians from Kansas City, Missouri
American drummers
1987 births
Guitarists from Missouri
American male bass guitarists
21st-century American drummers
21st-century American bass guitarists
21st-century American male musicians